Alexander Wright (born September 5, 2000) is an American football defensive end for the Cleveland Browns of the National Football League (NFL). He played college football at UAB.

Early life and high school
Wright grew up in Elba, Alabama and attended Elba High School. He was named second-team All-State as a senior after recording 63 tackles, 17 tackles for loss, and 6 sacks. Wright committed to play college football at UAB over offers from Wake Forest, Duke, Tulane, Virginia, and Louisville.

College career
Wright was named to the Conference USA All-Freshman team after recording 28 tackles, 8.5 tackles for loss, and 4.5 sacks with one forced fumble and two fumble recoveries. As a sophomore, he had 17 tackles with three tackles for loss and one sack. Wright was named second-team All-Conference USA after finishing his junior season with 46 tackles, 7.5 tackles for loss, seven sacks, and two forced fumbles. Following the end of the season, Wright declared that he would forgo his senior season and enter the 2022 NFL Draft.

Professional career

Wright was selected by the Cleveland Browns with the 78th overall pick in the third round of the 2022 NFL Draft.

References

External links
 Cleveland Browns bio
UAB Blazers bio

2000 births
Living people
Players of American football from Alabama
American football defensive ends
UAB Blazers football players
People from Elba, Alabama
Cleveland Browns players